Fitness, formerly Activity, is an exercise tracking companion app announced by Apple Inc. during their September 2014 Special Event. The app is available on iPhones running iOS 8.2 or above for users with a connected Apple Watch, later expanding to all iPhones regardless of Watch connectivity with the release of iOS 16. The application displays a summary view of user's recorded workouts from the Apple Watch or supported third-party apps and exercise equipment.

Features 
The app displays three 'activity rings', which are daily movement goals, and encourages users to 'close' all of their rings by the end of the day. The move ring tracks the number of diet calories or kilojoules burned (over and above quiescent), the exercise ring tracks minutes spent exercising, and the stand ring tracks the number of hours spent standing for at least one minute. Without a connected Apple Watch, the app will only display the user's move ring as the exercise and stand metrics cannot be measured using the iPhone. Activity rings can be shared with others to compare data and start competitions, which give an award to the person who has filled their rings the most over a seven-day period. Users can earn various awards based on user achievement, such as setting personal records or participating in limited-time challenges. Awards are digital equivalents of enamel pins or badges. 

All workouts recorded through the Workout app on the Apple Watch are viewable through the 'Summary' tab of the Fitness app and include relevant metrics and HealthKit data, such as heart rate, depending on the type of exercise. For outdoor activities, summaries also include weather conditions at the time of the workout and a map that outlines the route taken while exercising. Since iOS 15, a record of mindfulness activities can also be viewed from the summary tab. After a 180-day period, the app will also begin to show users their exercise trends averaged over the present and past rolling 90-day windows, displaying arrows next to various metrics. Arrows which are facing up show an improvement in an area, whereas downwards facing arrows show a decline.

Apple Fitness+ 
Apple Fitness+ is an ad-free video on demand guided workout streaming service announced during Apple's September 2020 Special Event and was officially launched on 14 December 2020. The service provides several video workout guides and routines from fitness professionals, displaying exercise statistics from the Apple Watch in the top-right corner of the video in real-time. Each workout is set to a curated playlist, with Apple Music subscribers given the option to download a workout playlist to their device for other use.  

The service is available within the Fitness app on iPhone, iPad, and Apple TV, and costs US$9.99 per month, US$79.99 per year, or is included in the premium tier of Apple One.

Available workouts 
Workouts are available for thirteen activities: core, cycling, dance, high-intensity interval training (HIIT), meditation, mindful cooldown, rowing, strength, treadmill walk, treadmill run, kickboxing, pilates, and yoga. Most workouts have three trainers, with one performing a modified, less intensive, version of the host's workout. The third instructor either matches the primary instructor or, in some cases, performs a more intensive version. Shorter workouts are also available, which have only a single instructor and include further instructions for those new to a particular exercise.

On January 21, 2021, the first batch of "Time to Walk" audio workouts were introduced. These podcasts for outdoor walking are led by celebrities from academia, entertainment, and sports, mixing talk with a short playlist. Similarly, "Time to Run" workouts were added to the service on January 10, 2022, which feature trainers completing popular running routes in different cities across the world while providing coaching and tips to the listener.

Trainers
As of September 2022, the following 25 trainers appear on the Apple Fitness+ page.

Ben Allen
Kyle Ardill
Scott Carvin
Gregg Cook
Josh Crosby
Tyrell Désean
Emily Fayette
Molly Fox
Anja Garcia
Marimba Gold-Watts
Jhon Gonzalez
JoAnna Hardy
Jamie-Ray Hartshorne

Sherica Holmon
Christian Howard
Dice Iida-Klein
LaShawn Jones
Jonelle Lewis
Cory Wharton-Malcolm
Kim Ngo
Kym Perfetto
Sam Sanchez
Jessica Skye
Darryl Whiting
Bakari Williams

Launch 
When Fitness+ was launched, it was available in Australia, Canada, Ireland, New Zealand, the UK, and the US. On 25 October 2021, Apple announced that beginning 3 November 2021, Fitness+ will also be available in 15 new countries, bringing the total number of countries the service is available to 21. In both new and existing markets, Fitness+ will be available in English, with subtitles in Brazilian Portuguese, English, French, German, Italian, Russian, and Spanish.

With the release of iOS 16.1, users can subscribe to Apple Fitness+ without an Apple Watch, though fewer metrics are displayed during workouts.

GymKit API 
GymKit is an integration API that was launched with watchOS 4.1 on 31 October 2017, which allows developers and manufacturers to enable bidirectional sync between the Apple Watch and certain cardio equipment. Once paired, compatible machines can send workout data and performance to the Fitness app.

See also
 Apple Health
 Google Fit

References

External links
 

IOS
IOS-based software made by Apple Inc.
Fitness apps
Health software